{{DISPLAYTITLE:C12H23N}}
The molecular formula C12H23N (molar mass: 181.32 g/mol, exact mass: 181.1830 u) may refer to:

 Dicyclohexylamine
 Leptacline